"Let It Roll (Let It Rock)" is a song written by Chuck Berry and recorded by American country music artist Mel McDaniel. It was released in March 1985 as the second and final single from McDaniel's album Let It Roll.  It peaked at both number 6 on the U.S. Billboard Hot Country Singles & Tracks chart and on the Canadian RPM Country Tracks chart.

Music video
The music video was directed by George Bloom and premiered in early 1985. It features the band playing on a flatcar in a train pulled by South Central Tennessee Railroad ALCO RS-11 #29.

Chart performance

References

1985 singles
Mel McDaniel songs
Songs written by Chuck Berry
Song recordings produced by Jerry Kennedy
Capitol Records Nashville singles
1985 songs